The Misery Index is an American television comedy game show developed for TBS that premiered on October 22, 2019. The show, based on the card game "Shit Happens," is hosted by Jameela Jamil, and stars the four members of The Tenderloins comedy troupe who also star in truTV's Impractical Jokers.

Andy Breckman, who created and wrote the TV shows Monk and The Good Cop, created the card game "Shit Happens" for his company Uncle Andy Toys. He developed the TV version with Ben & Dan Newmark of Grandma's House Entertainment.

The show features two competing teams, each composed of a non-celebrity contestant and two members of the Tenderloins, who will "attempt to determine the ranking of hilarious and miserable real-life events--from getting fired to accidentally sexting your grandfather--on a scale of 1–100." Michael Bloom, a senior vice president for TBS, said about the show's premise: "Andy Breckman and the Newmarks have hilariously gamified embarrassment, humiliation, and total misery."

Executive producers for the series are Breckman, the Newmark brothers of Grandma's House Entertainment, Howard Klein of 3 Arts Entertainment, and showrunner Rob Anderson. The series has run for three seasons so far; the first consisted of ten half-hour episodes, while the second consisted of twenty. In 2020, the series was renewed for a third season which premiered on January 26, 2021.

During the July 6, 2022 episode of “Talk is Jericho" podcast titled "The Impractical Jokers Appreciation Society" Vulcano commented that the show was "unceremoniously" not renewed by TBS but that he hoped it could come back at some point.

Gameplay
The main game consists of three rounds that involve rating and ranking miserable true stories. Ratings are on a numerical scale of 1 to 100, as determined by a panel of psychologists, and are based on the "Three Pillars of Misery": physical pain, emotional trauma, and long-term psychological impact. At the start of each episode, each contestant relates a story of his/her own whose rating is never revealed.

Round 1: Misery Lane
Two hypothetical situations are presented to the teams, and the contestant whose story has earned the higher Misery Index rating from the panel plays first. Each team must decide whether its contestant's story falls above, below, or between the two situations; a correct choice wins $500.

Round 2: More or Less Miserable
The trailing contestant (or the one who did not start Round 1 in case of a tie) plays first. Each team is shown two similar stories and must decide which one earned the higher Index rating, earning $1,000 for a correct guess.

Round 3: Master of Misery
One miserable story is presented to both teams, and the contestants separately and secretly lock in their guesses at its Index rating. The one whose guess is closer to the actual rating wins $2,000 and advances to the bonus round with his/her teammates. An exact guess doubles the value to $4,000. However, if the two guesses are identical or equally distant from the actual rating, another story is played as a tiebreaker with the same $2,000/$4,000 at stake.

Bonus Round: Margin of Misery
The winning contestant is shown three miserable stories, one at a time, and must guess the Index rating of each within a specified margin of error in order to win additional money as follows.
First story: $5,000 value, within 30 points
Second story: $10,000 value, within 20 points
Third story: $15,000 value, within 10 points

The contestant guesses by moving a range finder on a sliding scale, attempting to cover the actual rating, and has 10 seconds to lock in a guess on each story. He/she may choose one Tenderloin teammate for assistance. Before the third story is revealed, the other three Tenderloins join the contestant onstage to provide moral support.

The maximum potential winnings total is $35,500, obtained by guessing correctly in each of the first two rounds, winning $4,000 for an exact guess in the third, and successfully covering the actual Index rating of all three stories in the bonus round. On December 23, 2020, the final episode of season two was called a holiday special where the third story of the bonus round yielded $25,000. The contestant that reached that round, Buddy, had played a perfect game and won all three bonus round stories resulting in a grand total of $53,500.

See also
Misery index (economics)

References

External links

2010s American comedy game shows
2019 American television series debuts
2021 American television series endings
2020s American comedy game shows
TBS (American TV channel) original programming
Television game shows with incorrect disambiguation
Television series by 3 Arts Entertainment
Television series created by Andy Breckman
Television shows based on games
The Tenderloins